Mr. Finchley Discovers His England is a 1934 comedy novel by the British writer Victor Canning. It was published by Hodder and Stoughton, and a US edition published by Reynal and Hitchcock appeared in 1935 under the title Mr. Finchley's Holiday, and there were post-war editions from Pan Books, Heinemann and, recently (2019), from Farrago Books. It was the first of a trilogy starring the mild-mannered Edgar Finchley. The novel was a bestseller and allowed Canning to leave his job and devote himself full time to writing, later becoming known in particular for his thrillers.

Synopsis
Mister Finchley a middle-aged solicitor's clerk is told to take a holiday, for the first time in his working life. He plans to go to the seaside but enjoys a series of comic adventures on the way, and learns to love his native England.

References

Bibliography
 Burton, Alan. Historical Dictionary of British Spy Fiction. Rowman & Littlefield, 2016.
 Ehland, Christoph and Wächter, Cornelia. Middlebrow and Gender, 1890-1945. BRILL, 2016.

External links 
 Full bibliography
 The Victor Canning Pages

1934 British novels
British comedy novels
Novels set in England
Novels by Victor Canning
Hodder & Stoughton books